The Pacific Community (PC), formerly the South Pacific Commission (SPC), is an international development organisation governed by 27 members, including 22 Pacific island countries and territories around the Pacific Ocean. The organisation's headquarters are in Nouméa, New Caledonia, and it has regional offices in Suva, Pohnpei, and Port Vila, as well as field staff in other locations in the Pacific. Its working languages are English and French. It primarily provides technical and scientific advice, and acts as a conduit for funding of development projects from donor nations. Unlike the slightly smaller Pacific Islands Forum, the SPC is not a trade bloc, and does not deal with military or security issues.

The SPC's regional development issues include climate change, disaster risk management, fisheries, food security, education, gender equality, human rights, non-communicable diseases, agriculture, forestry and land use, water resources, and youth employment.

History 
The Pacific Community was founded in 1947 as the South Pacific Commission by six developed countries with strategic interests and territories in the region: Australia, France, the Netherlands, New Zealand, the United Kingdom, and the United States.

The SPC's founding charter is the Canberra Agreement. In the aftermath of World War II, the six colonial powers which created the SPC arguably intended it to secure Western political and military interests in the postwar Pacific. Two founding members, the Netherlands and the United Kingdom, have since withdrawn from the SPC as the Pacific territories they controlled either gained independence or the right to represent themselves in the organization.

From the start, the SPC's role was constrained. The invitation from Australia and New Zealand to the US, France, the Netherlands and the UK to participate in a South Seas Commission Conference in 1947 included the statement that "the [South Pacific] Commission to be set up should not be empowered to deal in any way with political matters or questions of defense or security". This constraint on discussion (particularly the constraint on discussing nuclear weapons testing in the region) led to the 1971 creation of the South Pacific Forum (now Pacific Islands Forum), which not only excluded the more distant "metropolitan" powers of France, UK and USA, but also at the time their Pacific island territories.

In 1949, the Pacific Community established its permanent headquarters in Nouméa, New Caledonia, at a former American military base. In 1995, a new headquarters was constructed close to the same location and the military base was demolished. A monument and plaque commemorating SPC's original headquarters location can be found on site of the Le Promenade complex at Anse Vata.

In 1962, the Pacific Community created the South Pacific Games Council with the goal of holding a regular Pacific wide sporting event. The first games Games were held in Suva, Fiji in 1963, with 646 participants from 13 Pacific territories taking part. Initially the Games were held at three-year intervals although this was subsequently expanded to 4 following the Tumon Games in Guam.

Dutch New Guinea, formerly represented in the SPC by the Netherlands, was transferred to United Nations authority in 1962 and to Indonesia the following year. Without any territory remaining in the region, the Netherlands withdrew from the SPC in 1962.

Governance of the SPC reflected the changing political environment. At inception, each member had equal representation and a single vote. When Western Samoa joined as newly independent state in 1965 the rules were changed to ensure that the Western foundation nations would maintain firm control over the organization. Australia was given five votes, France, Britain, New Zealand, and the United States four and Western Samoa just one.

In 1972, the first South Pacific Arts Festival was convened by SPC in Suva, Fiji. The event drew more than 1000 participants from 14 countries. In 1975 SPC created a Council of Pacific Arts, permanently making culture issues a part of the SPC mandate and establishing the Festival of Pacific Arts as a regular event.

In response to demand to rapid development of the Pacific regions media industry, SPC established a Regional Media Center in 1973 in collaboration with the recently created University of the South Pacific. The center produced audio material for the regions radio stations and provided training in video production.

With decolonization efforts expanding, newly independent states and nonindependent territories were also allowed to apply for membership. "As its membership grew, the character and scope of the SPC evolved to incorporate the indigenous peoples of the Pacific."

In 1983, at the Saipan Conference, unequal voting was abandoned, once again establishing a "one member, one vote" principle for SPC. However, this decision did not come without criticism as some pointed out that the combination of allowing membership to non-independent territories and establishing a one-vote per member principle effectively provided additional votes to France and the United States who continued to maintain control over Pacific territories. It was also during the Saipan Conference that the Committee of Representatives of Governments and Administrations (CRGA) was established, creating the only Pacific regional organization that was both fully representative of the Pacific, and fully governed by its membership.

In 1988, the SPC become a founding member of the Council of Regional Organisations in the Pacific or CROP (formerly the South Pacific Organisations Coordinating Committee, SPOCC)  "to improve cooperation, coordination, and collaboration among the various intergovernmental regional organisations to work toward achieving the common goal of sustainable development in the Pacific region".

The United Kingdom withdrew from the organisation in 1996 and rejoined in 1998. The UK withdrew a second time in 2004. The UK's interests in the Pacific Community were prior to Brexit primarily managed through the European Union, although the UK also is a direct donor for some projects. The UK rejoined in 2021 after reopening its high commissions in Tonga, Samoa and its embassy in Vanuatu in the past two years.

In 1996, the Pacific Heads of Agriculture and Livestock Programmes asked "to put in place, both in their countries and through regional cooperation, policies to conserve, protect and best utilize their plant genetic resources". As these resources were considered a shared regional responsibility, it made sense for a regional organization to respond to this need. SPC established the Regional Germplasm Centre (RGC) in 1998. The facility grew rapidly and in 2007 was renamed Centre for Pacific Crops and Trees (CePaCT). It currently holds more than 2000 varieties of genetic material on Pacific strains of taro, banana, breadfruit and others, and has been instrumental in helping to rebuild island agriculture after disasters.

In 2000, SPC became the first CROP organization to be headed by a woman, Lourdes Pangelinan of Guam, who served in the role from 2000 to 2006.

Pacific Way television series 
The SPC began producing a television program, known as The Pacific Way, in 1995. Supported by UNESCO as a trial for exchanging news stories, the first season was shared freely with just one tape circulated between TV stations in several Pacific Island nations. The programs' regional and local focus made it popular addition to local television schedules and at its height was producing and distributing 26 annual episodes to 21 TV stations around the region. Since 2017, the Pacific Way has been developing 10 episodes per season for television and has been reintroduced to radio through its complementary podcasts. The half-hour show shares development stories about the Pacific for the Pacific. It covers important topics and key issues, such as climate change adaptation, health, youth employment, innovation in agriculture, fisheries management and the protection of cultural heritage.

Name and logo 
While the acronym "SPC" has been consistent since the organization's founding in 1947, the name and logo have evolved over the years. The organization's original name was the South Pacific Commission, which represented the limited nature of its membership and activities. The name was changed in 1997 to the Pacific Community, reflecting the growth of membership across the entire Pacific region. The current logo was officially adopted in 2015.

Present 
The Pacific Community today includes 22 Pacific island countries and territories, which were all previously territories (or, in the case of Tonga, a protectorate) of the original founding members of the SPC, along with the developed countries of Australia, France, New Zealand, the United Kingdom, and the United States:

The SPC is concentrated on providing technical and scientific advice to its member governments and administrations, particularly in areas where small island states lack the wherewithal to maintain purely national cadres of expertise, or in areas where regional co-operation or interaction is necessary.

The operational budget of the Pacific Community in 2018 was approximately €82 million. The organization is financially supported through a combination of membership fees and donor funding. Its major funding partners include the European Union, the Australian Department of Foreign Affairs and Trade, the New Zealand Ministry of Foreign Affairs, and the governments of France and the United States. Additional funding and knowledge partners include:

Divisions 
The SPC works across more than 25 sectors. It is involved in such areas as fisheries science, public health surveillance, geoscience and conservation of plant genetic resources for food and agriculture, statistics and education. Using a multi-sector approach in responding to its members' development priorities, SPC draws on skills and capabilities from around the region and internationally, and supports the empowerment of Pacific communities and sharing of expertise and skills between countries and territories.

SPC currently has nine divisions:

 Climate Change and Environmental Stability (CCES) 
Educational Quality and Assessment Program (EQAP)
 Fisheries, Aquaculture and Marine Ecosystems (FAME)
 Geoscience Energy and Maritime (GEM)
 Land Resources Division (LRD)
 Public Health Division (PHD)
 Regional Rights Resource Team (RRRT)
 Social Development Program (SDP)
 Statistics for Development (SDD)

SPC Directors-General

See also

CROP agencies
Pacific Islands Forum
Pacific Regional Environment Programme
University of the South Pacific
Forum Fisheries Agency
South Pacific Tourism Organisation
Pacific Aviation Safety Office

Others
Centre for Pacific Crops and Trees
Festival of Pacific Arts
Pacific Games
Pacific Island Farmers Organisation Network (PIFON)
Pacific Islands Private Sector Organisation (PIPSO)
Asia-Pacific Fishery Commission (APFIC)
Western and Central Pacific Fisheries Commission
International organization

References

Further reading 
 Mitcham, Chad, 'Forsyth, William Douglass (1909–1993)', Australian Dictionary of Biography, National Centre of Biography, Australian National University, published online 2018.
 South Pacific Commission. 'Meeting House of the Pacific: The Story of the SPC, 1947–2007', Nouméa, New Caledonia: SPC Secretariat, 2007.

External links 
 Pacific Community official website
 The Canberra Agreement establishing the South Pacific Community
 The Pacific Community gains official observer status with United Nations

 
International organizations based in Oceania
New Zealand–Pacific relations
Pacific Community
Organizations established in 1947
Intergovernmental organizations established by treaty